Matthew Kingsley (30 September 1874 – 27 March 1960) was a footballer who played as goalkeeper for Darwen, Newcastle United, West Ham United, Queens Park Rangers, Barrow and Rochdale.

Club career
In all, Kingsley made 180 appearances in six First Division seasons at Newcastle United and nine appearances in the FA Cup, which included an infamous cup exit at Southampton in 1900.

Kingsley lost his place to Jimmy Lawrence midway through the 1903–04 season and moved on to West Ham United. Kingsley departed West Ham after kicking former West Ham player Herbert Lyon in a game against Brighton & Hove Albion in March 1905, causing a crowd invasion and a near riot.

International career
In 1901 he became the first player to receive a call-up to the England national team whilst at Newcastle. Kingsley played the full 90 minutes in a 6–0 victory for England against Wales in a British Home Championship at St James' Park on 18 March 1901.

References

External links
Spartacus article

1874 births
1960 deaths
People from Turton
English footballers
Association football goalkeepers
Darwen F.C. players
Newcastle United F.C. players
West Ham United F.C. players
Queens Park Rangers F.C. players
Rochdale A.F.C. players
Barrow A.F.C. players
England international footballers
English Football League players
English Football League representative players